Carlos Monasterios Hernández (born March 21, 1986) is a Venezuelan former right-handed professional baseball pitcher. He played with the Los Angeles Dodgers of Major League Baseball (MLB) in 2010.

Career

New York Yankees/Philadelphia Phillies
He was originally signed as a non-drafted free agent by the New York Yankees in 2006 but was shortly traded to the Philadelphia Phillies (along with Matt Smith and C. J. Henry) for Bobby Abreu and Cory Lidle.

With the Clearwater Threshers in 2009 he was selected to the Florida State League mid-season All-Star team.

Los Angeles Dodgers
Monasterios was selected by the New York Mets in the Rule 5 draft after the 2009 season and promptly traded to the Los Angeles Dodgers, who added him to their 25-man roster.

He made his Major League debut on April 5, 2010 against the Pittsburgh Pirates, working a scoreless inning of relief. His first career victory came in a 13 inning game against the Washington Nationals on April 24. His first Major League start was on May 1, 2010 against the Pittsburgh Pirates, allowing one run in four innings of work. He remained on the Dodgers major league roster all season, appearing in 32 games and making 13 starts. For the season, he pitched 88.1 innings with a record of 3-5, a 4.38 ERA and 52 strikeouts.

He was assigned to the AAA Albuquerque Isotopes to start the 2011 season. However, he only made one start for the Isotopes, pitching 4 innings and allowing 6 runs. He was placed on the disabled list after that start with elbow inflammation and on July 15, he underwent Tommy John surgery, shutting him down for the season. On November 18, 2011 he was outrighted to the minors and removed from the 40 man roster.

He encountered further arm problems when he reported for spring training in 2012 and had a surgery in March to relocate the ulnar nerve. The Dodgers released him on April 8.

Attempted comeback
After missing most of 2011 and all of 2012 due to injuries, he returned in 2013 to play for the El Paso Diablos of the American Association of Independent Professional Baseball. In 2014, he was with the Guerreros de Oaxaca of the Mexican League.

See also
 List of Major League Baseball players from Venezuela

References

External links

Venezuelan Professional Baseball League career statistics

1986 births
Living people
Albuquerque Isotopes players
Bravos de Margarita players
Clearwater Threshers players
El Paso Diablos players
Guerreros de Oaxaca players
Florida Complex League Phillies players
Gulf Coast Yankees players
Lakewood BlueClaws players
Los Angeles Dodgers players
Major League Baseball pitchers
Major League Baseball players from Venezuela
Mexican League baseball pitchers
Navegantes del Magallanes players
Pastora de los Llanos players
Pastora de Occidente players
Reading Phillies players
Sultanes de Monterrey players
Venezuela national baseball team players
Venezuelan expatriate baseball players in Mexico
Venezuelan expatriate baseball players in the United States
People from Miranda (state)